Momonipta is a genus of moths of the family Notodontidae. It consists of the following species:
Momonipta albiplaga Warren, 1897
Momonipta onorei Miller, 2008

Notodontidae of South America